Bitter & Sweet is the first album released by Beni Arashiro under her new label Universal Music Japan and her new stage name, Beni on September 2, 2009. The CD+DVD version is a limited edition with all her single PVs and two new PVs named "The Boy Is Mine", which features Tynisha Keli, and "Superstar" which are both cover songs. The vocals for the DJ Hasebe Remix of "Kiss Kiss Kiss" were recorded from one of her live performances. The song "Dakishimete", featuring Dohzi-T, was released on 19 August as an online download on Recochoku's Chaku Uta. The song debuted on the #5 place on the Chaku-Uta charts and the #2 place on the Recochoku chart. The album debuted at the #6 place on the Oricon chart. The day after it rose to the #5 place. At the end of the first week, the album ended up on the #5 spot on the weekly chart selling about 30,000 copies making it Beni's highest ranked and best selling album to date. She went on a release club tour. The tour was named Bitter&Sweet RELEASE TOUR. The tour was so successful that new tour dates were added. Bitter & Sweet has been certified Gold by RIAJ for shipment of 100,000 copies. On 28 December, it was announced that Bitter & Sweet sold over 100,000 copies.

Track listing

Charts

References

External links 
 Universal Bitter & Sweet mini-site 

2009 albums
Japanese-language albums
Beni (singer) albums